Arne Hoel (5 April 1927 – 10 September 2006) was a Norwegian ski jumper who competed in the 1940s and 1950s. He won the ski jumping event at the Holmenkollen ski festival three times (1948, 1951 and 1959). Because of his successes, Hoel was awarded the Holmenkollen medal in 1956 (shared with Borghild Niskin and Arnfinn Bergmann). He also finished sixth and eleventh in the individual large hill event at the 1952 and 1956 Winter Olympics, respectively.

References

External links

 – click Holmenkollmedaljen for downloadable pdf file 
 – click Vinnere for downloadable pdf file 

Ski jumpers at the 1952 Winter Olympics
Ski jumpers at the 1956 Winter Olympics
Holmenkollen medalists
Holmenkollen Ski Festival winners
Norwegian male ski jumpers
Olympic ski jumpers of Norway
2006 deaths
1927 births
20th-century Norwegian people